Bezirk Waidhofen an der Thaya  is a district of the state of Lower Austria in Austria.

Municipalities
Suburbs, hamlets and other subdivisions of a municipality are indicated in small characters.
 Dietmanns
 Alt-Dietmanns, Neu-Dietmanns
 Dobersberg
 Brunn, Dobersberg, Goschenreith am Taxenbache, Großharmanns, Hohenau, Kleinharmanns, Lexnitz, Merkengersch, Reibers, Reinolz, Riegers, Schuppertholz
 Gastern
 Frühwärts, Garolden, Gastern, Immenschlag, Kleinmotten, Kleinzwettl, Ruders, Weißenbach, Wiesmaden
 Groß-Siegharts
 Ellends, Fistritz, Groß-Siegharts, Loibes, Sieghartsles, Waldreichs, Weinern, Wienings
 Karlstein an der Thaya
 Eggersdorf, Göpfritzschlag, Goschenreith, Griesbach, Hohenwarth, Karlstein an der Thaya, Münchreith an der Thaya, Obergrünbach, Schlader, Thuma, Thures, Wertenau
 Kautzen
 Engelbrechts, Groß-Taxen, Kautzen, Kleingerharts, Klein-Taxen, Pleßberg, Reinberg-Dobersberg, Tiefenbach, Triglas
 Ludweis-Aigen
 Aigen, Blumau an der Wild, Diemschlag, Drösiedl, Drösiedl, Kollmitzgraben, Liebenberg, Ludweis, Oedt an der Wild, Pfaffenschlag, Radessen, Radl, Sauggern, Seebs, Tröbings
 Pfaffenschlag bei Waidhofen
 Arnolz, Artolz, Eisenreichs, Großeberharts, Johannessiedlung, Kleingöpfritz, Pfaffenschlag bei Waidhofen a.d.Thaya, Rohrbach, Schwarzenberg
 Raabs an der Thaya
 Alberndorf, Eibenstein, Großau, Koggendorf, Kollmitzdörfl, Liebnitz, Lindau, Luden, Modsiedl, Mostbach, Neuriegers, Niklasberg, Nonndorf, Oberndorf bei Raabs, Oberndorf bei Weikertschlag, Oberpfaffendorf, Pommersdorf, Primmersdorf, Raabs an der Thaya, Rabesreith, Reith, Rossa, Schaditz, Speisendorf, Süßenbach, Trabersdorf, Unterpertholz, Unterpfaffendorf, Weikertschlag an der Thaya, Wetzles, Wilhelmshof, Zabernreith, Zemmendorf, Ziernreith
 Thaya
 Eggmanns, Großgerharts, Jarolden, Niederedlitz, Oberedlitz, Peigarten, Ranzles, Schirnes, Thaya
 Vitis
 Eschenau, Eulenbach, Grafenschlag, Großrupprechts, Heinreichs, Jaudling, Jetzles, Kaltenbach, Kleingloms, Kleinschönau, Schacherdorf, Schoberdorf, Sparbach, Stoies, Vitis, Warnungs
 Waidhofen an der Thaya
 Altwaidhofen, Dimling, Götzles, Hollenbach, Jasnitz, Kleineberharts, Matzles, Puch, Pyhra, Schlagles, Ulrichschlag, Vestenötting, Waidhofen an der Thaya
 Waidhofen an der Thaya-Land
 Brunn, Buchbach, Edelprinz, Götzweis, Griesbach, Kainraths, Nonndorf, Sarning, Vestenpoppen, Wiederfeld, Wohlfahrts
 Waldkirchen an der Thaya
 Fratres, Gilgenberg, Rappolz, Rudolz, Schönfeld, Waldhers, Waldkirchen an der Thaya
 Windigsteig
 Edengans, Grünau, Kleinreichenbach, Kottschallings, Lichtenberg, Markl, Matzlesschlag, Meires, Rafings, Rafingsberg, Waldberg, Willings, Windigsteig

References

External links

 
Districts of Lower Austria